Static & Silence is the third and final studio album by English alternative rock band The Sundays, released in the UK by Parlophone on 22 September 1997, and in the US by Geffen on 23 September 1997. The title is a quote from the album's final track "Monochrome", and the album's cover photo is a reference to the subject of "Monochrome", the TV screening of the Apollo 11 moon landing.

Guitarist and leader David Gavurin has said that by the time of the recording of Static & Silence the band had mellowed somewhat with age, and that he and wife Harriet Wheeler were influenced more by Van Morrison, which gives some songs on the album their folk-rock bent ("Folk Song" even quotes from Morrison's "And It Stoned Me"). The couple had also been listening a lot to Frank Sinatra songs and 1960s French film music.

Kevin Jamieson, who performed some percussion work on the album, joined The Sundays during their UK and US album support tour as a backup guitarist. He is perhaps best known for his prior work as the lead singer for Jim Jiminee.

Singles
Lead single "Summertime" charted at No. 15 in the UK Singles Chart, making it their highest-charting single in their home country, at No. 10 and 13 on the US Modern Rock and Adult Top 40 charts, respectively, and at No. 41 in Australia. Second single "Cry" peaked at No. 44 in the UK Singles Chart.

Track listing
All songs written by David Gavurin and Harriet Wheeler.

Personnel
 Harriet Wheeler – vocals, string arrangements and orchestration, brass and flute orchestration
 David Gavurin – guitar, Hammond organ, piano, percussion, string arrangements and orchestration, brass and flute arrangements and orchestration
 Paul Brindley – bass
 Patrick Hannan – drums
 Dave Anderson – Hammond organ, piano
 Kev Jamieson – Hammond organ, piano
 Martin Ditcham – percussion
 Dave Pulfreman – percussion
 Audrey Riley – string arrangements and orchestration
 Martin Green – brass and flute arrangements and orchestration

Charts

References

External links
 

The Sundays albums
1997 albums